Oba Sikiru Ajibowu Adeilo Adeyiga is a Nigerian monarch. He is the current king of Irolu Remo. A town under Ikenne local government, and part of the 33 rulers under Akarigbo of Remo.

Early life 
Oba Sikiru Adeyiga was born on October 1, 1938 to the family of Alhaji Ismaila Adeyiga and Alhaja Nimota Oladunni Adeyiga.

He started his primary education in 1946 only to complete a supposed six years course in 1955, spending nine years at primary school in Irolu due to his playful attitude.

Kingship 
He was installed as the new king of Irolu in 1991 following the death of the previous king Oba Ogunlesi

He faced competition for the title, and he was advised he need to kill his competitors for him to ascend the throne of the late king he however claim that he turned down the advice.

He was nominated by his family and unanimouslyly endorsed by seven king makers, one of his co-contestants, Adetoye Odujeko dragged him to court where he claimed that he was not a member of the ruling family asked to nominate a candidate for the vacant throne.

He construct a new palace for the town

During the 2019 general election he urged traditional rulers not to interfere in the election, by letting its people decide for themselves

References 

1938 births
Living people
Nigerian royalty